861 Naval Air Squadron (861 NAS) was a Naval Air Squadron of the Royal Navy's Fleet Air Arm.

Service history
861 Squadron was formed in September 1946 at RNAS Dale, Wales, from personnel of the Royal Netherlands Navy, under the command of Luitenant G.H. Greve. Flying the Fairey Firefly, the squadron was assigned to the escort carrier HNLMS Karel Doorman (QH1) in February 1947, but was disbanded soon afterwards.

References

800 series Fleet Air Arm squadrons
Military units and formations established in 1946
1946 establishments in the United Kingdom